Zella Wolofsky (born 1947) is a Canadian modern dancer, researcher, columnist, and educator.  

Her research became the launchpad for applying computer interpretation to Labanotation at Simon Fraser University, which led to the development of LifeForms, the computer program used by Merce Cunningham in the later part of his career. Journalist Robert Sarti described her research as a way for choreographers to eventually be able to try out new movements, similar to how a composer might "doodle" on a piano.

Biography 
Zella Wolofsky was born in 1947 in Canada.  She danced with Dancemakers; Winnipeg's Contemporary Dancers; Burnaby Dance; Laura Dean; and independent choreographers such as Jean Pierre Perrault, Muna Tseng, Elizabeth Chitty as part of 15 Dance Labs, founded by Miriam Adams and Lawrence Adams in Toronto, Canada.  She was also known as a performer, for her reconstruction of Doris Humphrey 1931 masterpiece solo, Two Ecstatic Themes, and she was the first to perform this solo widely in Canada. She studied modern dance with Merce Cunningham, Viola Farber, Peggy Baker, Ruth Currier, Milton Myers, Bella Lewitzky and ballet with Alfredo Corvino and Maggie Black.

She received a B.Sc. degree from McGill University, a 1974 M.Sc. degree in Kinesiology from Simon Fraser University, and a Doctorate in Education from University of Toronto. Her graduate studies were supported by Canada Council Humanities Grant, National Research Council Canada Award, and Social Sciences and Humanities Research Council Doctoral Fellowship.  LifeForm software was the brainchild of Wolofsky and Tom Calvert, and later, Thecla Schiphorst. Wolofsky was the first person who applied Labanotation, a system of human movements, to computers, which was part of her masters thesis. She had been interested in the creation of computer animation of dancers and their movement. 

Wolofsky was on the Board of Directors of Dancer Transition Resource Centre and Peggy Baker Dance Projects and served as Board Secretary for both organizations. While in Vancouver in the 1970s, she wrote for Dance Magazine as Foreign Correspondent from Vancouver.

She was married to Douglas Tyndall Wright, first Dean of Engineering and 3rd President of University of Waterloo. He died in May 2020.

References 

1947 births
Living people
McGill University alumni
Simon Fraser University alumni
University of Toronto alumni
20th-century Canadian dancers
Modern dancers
Canadian computer scientists
Canadian women academics